Stop the World is the second and last album from the Austin, Texas-based punk rock band Riddlin' Kids. It was released on October 19, 2004, under the Sony label. The release of this album was the last output from the Riddlin' Kids. The band stopped touring less than a year after the album's release. The song Stop The World was used in the video game MX vs. ATV Unleashed.

Track listing
Never Live It Down - 3:32
Get To It - 3:14
Stop The World - 3:15
Apology - 3:34
Promise You Anything - 3:16
Talk Of The Town - 2:32
I Want You To Know - 3:45
I Hate You - 3:40
Revenge - 3:59
Turn Around - 2:37
Ship Jumper - 2:58
Just Another Day - 3:06

References

2004 albums
Riddlin' Kids albums
Columbia Records albums